AAA, la película: Sin límite en el tiempo (also known as AAA - The Movie or simply Triple A) is a 2010 animated action-dramedy film produced by Ánima Estudios and distributed by Videocine. It is a fictionalization of the lucha libre wrestling team organization, Lucha Libre AAA World Wide, it was released in theaters on January 22, 2010.

Premise
In the world of wrestling, the feud between Rudos and Técnicos has always existed, but it has never left the ring. One night, La Parka steals the championship from Abismo negro, which angers him and threatens to end the AAA with the aid of Chessman and Cibérnetico. With the sudden apparition of a mysterious, former enemy of the AAA; La Parka, alongside Octagón, Gronda, Kenzo Suzuki, Mascarita Sagrada, Faby Apache, and others, get into an adventure that involves an abandoned psychiatric, killer cyborgs, giant dragonflies, legendary warriors and time travel.

Cast
César Arias as Dr. Transistor
Jorge Badillo as Charly Manson
Manuel Campuzano as Chessman
Cibernético as Cibernético
Bruno Coronel as Yónatan
Sergio Coto as Abismo Negro
Rolando de Castro as Octagón
Cinthya de Pando as Elvira
Carlos del Campo as Casero
Elegido as Elegido
Eduardo Garza as Mascarita Sagrada
Andrés Gutiérrez as Parka
Jesus Guzman as Kenzo
Marina Huerta as Mamá de Abismo
Alejandro Mayen as Triple Dragón
Luis Alfonso Mendoza as Robotito
El Mesías as El Mesías
Doctor Alfonso Morales as Dr. Morales
Salvador Reyes as Gronda
Arturo Rivera as El Rudo Rivera
Alberto Rodriguez as Locutor 70's
Anette Ugalde as Faby Apache
Victor Vallejo as Locutor
Zorro as himself

References

External links
Official Website 

Mexican animated films
Ánima Estudios films
2010s Spanish-language films
Mexican action comedy-drama films
2010s Mexican films